42 Orionis is a class B1V (blue main-sequence) star in the constellation Orion. Its apparent magnitude is 4.59 and it is approximately 900 light years away based on parallax.

The primary star, Aa, has one spectroscopic companion Ab of magnitude 6.3 and separation 0.16", and a more distant companion B of 7.5 magnitude at 1.6" separation.

c Orionis is surrounded by NGC 1977 one of a smaller fainter group of named nebulae just north of the Orion Nebula. c Ori is the star which excites and illuminates NGC 1977.

References

Orion (constellation)
B-type main-sequence stars
Orionis, c
BD-04 1185
Orionis, 42
026237
1892
037018
Suspected variables